MetroCity or Metro City or variation, can refer to:

 Metropolitan area of a city
 Central city of a metropolitan area
 Metropolis, a metropolitan city

Places
Metro City (Hong Kong), a private housing estate and a shopping centre in Tseung Kwan O, Hong Kong
Metro-City, a famous shoppingmall in Xujiahui, Shanghai, China
MetroCity AVM, a shopping mall in Istanbul, Turkey
Metro City metro station, Najpur Metro, Najpur, Vidarbha, Maharashtra, India.
Metro City, Changwon, Gyeongsangnam-do, South Korea; a real estate development, see List of tallest buildings in South Korea
Metrocity Towers, Istanbul, Turkey; a real estate development, see List of tallest buildings in Istanbul

Fictional locations
Metro City is a fictional setting for              

Final Fight, a fighting game series taking place on the Atlantic coast
Nightshade (1992 video game)
Double Dragon (TV series), a 1993 animated television program
Inspector Gadget (1983 TV series), an animated television series and 1999 film
Viper (TV series), a 1990s television series
Astro Boy (film), a 2009 CGI Movie
Megamind, a 2010 CGI Movie
A level in the 2004 Video Game War of the Monsters, set in the 1950s
Primary location of 21 Jump Street film

Other uses
 Optare MetroCity, a motorbus, an integral midibus manufactured by Optare
 Metro City Bank, a U.S. bank
 MetroCity AI, an IT company in the Philippines

See also

 Metro (city), a city in Indonesia
 Sydney Metro City & Southwest, a rapid transit project in Sydney, Australia
 
 
 
 
 Metro (disambiguation)
 City (disambiguation)